Spinetoli is a comune (municipality) in the Province of Ascoli Piceno in the Italian region Marche, located about  south of Ancona and about  east of Ascoli Piceno.

Spinetoli borders the following municipalities: Ancarano, Castorano, Colli del Tronto, Controguerra, Monsampolo del Tronto, Offida.

Demographic evolution

References

Cities and towns in the Marche